Euphorbia moratii is a species of plant in the family Euphorbiaceae. It is endemic to Madagascar.  Its natural habitats are subtropical or tropical dry lowland grassland and rocky areas. It is threatened by habitat loss.

References

Endemic flora of Madagascar
moratii
Vulnerable plants
Taxonomy articles created by Polbot